Ken Stuart is the founder of Center for Global Infectious Disease Research, where he continues scientific research on trypanosomes and malaria. In 2010, Stuart received a grant from the Paul G. Allen Family Foundation to continue his research.

References

External links
 Biography at Seattle Biomed

Year of birth missing (living people)
Living people
American microbiologists
American medical researchers